Nimalka Fernando is an attorney-at-law and women’s rights activist from Sri Lanka. She is a member of the Democratic People’s Movement in Sri Lanka, which is a coalition of people’s movements, NGOs and trade unions initiating action and dialogue for alternative development paradigms. She is President of the International Movement Against All Forms of Discrimination and Racism (IMADR) and the Women’s Forum for Peace in Sri Lanka. Nimalka is a founding member of Asian Regional Exchange for New Alternatives or ARENA and was a member of the ARENA Executive Board 1994 – 1997.

In March 2018, Fernando was appointed by Sri Lankan President Maithripala Sirisena as one of the commissioners for the Office of Missing Persons (OMP). Her appointment was opposed by The Global Sri Lankan Forum which was expressed through a statement requesting for her removal.

References

Arena bio of Nimalka Fernando

External links
BBC interview with Nimalka Fernando
IPS interview with Nimalka Fernando

Sinhalese lawyers
Sri Lankan human rights activists
Sri Lankan women's rights activists
Living people
Year of birth missing (living people)